Thillalangadi is a 2010 Indian Tamil-language action comedy film directed by M. Raja. A remake of the 2009 Telugu film Kick, it stars Raja's brother Jayam Ravi along with Tamannaah, and Shaam, who reprises his role from Kick, and a supporting cast including Prabhu, Suhasini Maniratnam, Vadivelu, Santhanam, and Sanchita Shetty. The film features a soundtrack composed by Yuvan Shankar Raja, whilst S. Thaman's original score has been reused. The film, produced by Raja's father Editor Mohan and to be distributed by Sun Pictures, released on 23 July 2010.

Thillalangadi depicts the story of Krishna (Jayam Ravi), a brilliant student who has excelled in all aspects of life but loves to have an adventure in his life and would do anything just to experience this kick (addiction).

Plot
Krishna is a happy-go-lucky youth who excels in every field but always does strange and dangerous things to obtain a certain "kick" – a thrill or excitement that he craves. One such activity is secretly double-crossing his childhood friend Das while helping him elope. At this point, he meets Nisha, who is shocked at his recklessness and writes him off as crazy. Krishna sets his sights on Nisha and woos her in a very unorthodox way; he begs her not to fall in love with him. After a host of comical situations involving Krishna's caring but easygoing parents, local thugs, and an ever-present comic relief Jackson, Nisha accepts Krishna's love. However, she sets a condition: Krishna must stay in a well-paying job (he had resigned from other jobs due to lack of "kick"), and only then will she agree to marry him. Krishna accepts but soon resigns again for the same reason and tries to hide it from Nisha. When Nisha finds out, she breaks up with him and leaves him for good.

Some months later, Nisha's parents arrange for her to meet a prospective suitor in Malaysia. Though reluctant, she meets the suitor Krishna Kumar, a tough but honest policeman. She narrates the story of her affair with Krishna, and Krishna Kumar reveals that he is tracking a dangerous thief who has stolen large amounts of money from wealthy (mostly corrupt) politicians. At Malaysia, Nisha, her sister, and Jackson run into Krishna again but learn that he has lost his memory and cannot remember his past life. Nisha sees this as an opportunity to start their relationship again from scratch. However, it is revealed that Krishna is not really suffering from amnesia; he has faked his condition by convincing an amnesiac that he is a doctor, and tricked him into diagnosing his condition falsely. Nisha is upset but realizes that it was done due to his love for her, and she has hidden her own feelings from him. They reconcile.

Meanwhile, it is revealed that the thief whom Krishna Kumar has been tracking is Krishna. His motives are simple; he steals ill-gotten money from politicians to pay for operations of children suffering from cancer. After manipulating various people, such as an MLA, and stealing from them, he is finally caught in the act by Krishna Kumar. Krishna is still unfazed, celebrating his failure at a street party. He dares Krishna Kumar to catch him in his final crime: stealing money from the minister. After many harrowing stunts, Krishna pulls it off successfully. Krishna Kumar is demoted from his job for his failure and is shocked to learn that his replacement is Krishna, who promises to "guard" the minister's remaining money. Knowing what is in store for the politicians, Krishna Kumar leaves with a new respect for his foe.

Cast

Production

Development 
After the Telugu film Kick, directed by Surender Reddy and starring Ravi Teja, Ileana D'Cruz and Shaam, which was released in early May 2009, went on to become highly successful at the box office, 'Editor' Mohan, father of M. Raja and Jayam Ravi, purchased the remake rights for the Tamil version, paying an "astronomical amount", less than one month later. While Mohan himself would produce the film, Mohan's elder son, M. Raja, was made the director, directing again his brother Jayam Ravi, who would later bag the lead role in the film. It is, noticeably, the fifth "remake project" of this combo, featuring 'Editor' Mohan as the producer, M. Raja as the director and Jayam Ravi as the lead actor, after Jayam,  M. Kumaran Son of Mahalakshmi,  Something Something ... Unakkum Enakkum and Santosh Subramaniam.

Casting 
For the lead role, played by Ravi Teja in the original version, several popular actors, including Vijay and Madhavan were considered and approached. As per reports, this film was planned to be Vijay's 51st film, which, however, turned out to be not true. Finally, Jayam Ravi was hired for the role, teaming up once again with his father and brother.

The lead female role, originally played by Ileana D'Cruz, was eventually won by Tamannaah. Initially, the crew had planned to sign Ileana for the same role in Tamil as well and approached her, but her father is said to have refused the offer as he didn't want his daughter to play the same role again. Also actress Bhanu, who had starred in the films Thaamirabharani and the very recently released Azhagar Malai, was approached for the role. However, she, too, reused the offer as she felt the role was too glamorous and she wouldn't fit the role. Whilst all his earlier remakes had the actress, who played the role in the original film, in the Tamil version as well, M. Raja, for the first time, was not able to sign the actress of the original Telugu version.

Meanwhile, Shaam, who played a vital role in the Telugu version, took up the same the role in Tamil, whilst Prabhu was hired for a "significant role" and Vadivelu and Santhanam were hired for the film's comedy portions. Prabhu Ganesan would be playing the role of Ravi's father, which was played by Sayaji Shinde in the original version. It was said, that yesteryear actor Karthik was initially considered and approached for the role, before Prabhu Ganesan was finally confirmed. Suhasini Mani Ratnam was hired to enact Ravi's mother character. Unlike in Raja's earlier remakes, which all had music scored by the composer who scored the original version and the same songs as well (except for M. Kumaran Son Of Mahalakshmi), composer Yuvan Shankar Raja was hired for the musical score this time, replacing Thaman, who composed the music of Kick. Apart from Vadivelu and Santhanam, the film stars an array of comedians such as Livingston, Mayilsamy, Kanja Karuppu, Manobala, Thyagu and Sathyan as well.

Filming 
The film was formally launched on 19 August 2009 at AVM Studios. The first shot, featuring Jayam Ravi and Tamannaah, was directed by S. Shankar, with actor Vijay giving the inaugural clap shot. The launch was attended by many prominent people from the Tamil film industry as Tamil Film Producers Council chief Ramanarayanan, KRG, Abirami Ramanathan, S. A. Chandrasekhar, R. B. Chowdhary, Ram Kumar, Kasthuri Raja, PL Thenappan, actor Karthi and actress Khushbu among others.

The film was shot at various locations, including Chennai (India), Kuala Lumpur (Malaysia), Bangkok (Thailand) and Singapore. The crew, including director Raja, Jayam Ravi, manager Senthil, cinematographer B. Rajasekar and art director Milan had been looking for locations in Malaysia in August 2009, after which the film shooting began. At first, shooting was held in Chennai for nearly 20 days, following which the crew flew to Malaysia, where a major portion of the film was to be shot, where the original film was shot as well. By mid-November, the crew had completed a 30-day schedule in Malaysia. The shoot in Malaysia involved an action sequence, filmed by three cameras simultaneously, which was shot on busy roads with special permissions from the local police authorities and a song sequence featuring Ravi and Tamannaah. Shooting was held also at the famous Petronas Twin Towers and on the Singapore-Malaysian railway line. During the 30-day filming, the September 2009 Sumatra earthquakes occurred, which the team luckily survived. In late January 2010, a special song ("Solpechu Ketkadha Sundari"), widely publicized as the "360 degree song" was shot. It was filmed using a Nero motion control camera that revolves on a 360 degree angle set, which was handled by an Australian specialist Scott and would later look like a single shot. This song, choreographed by Shobi, which would feature 15 Jayam Ravis and 5 Tamannaahs, was completed in around 45 hours, on which alone nearly Rs. 75 lakhs was said to be spent.

Soundtrack 

The Thillalangadi soundtrack is composed by Yuvan Shankar Raja, working together with director M. Raja for the first time. The soundtrack album features 7 songs, two of which have been reused from the original version, composed by Thaman, as per Raja's wish. The lyrics are penned by Na. Muthukumar and Viveka. The audio was released on 2 July 2010 at the Sun TV studios and premiered on Sun Music in the evening. The background score was taken from the original, scored by Thaman. It comprises the first time working together of two legendary singers K.S.Chitra and Shreya Ghoshal. This duo got a nomination for best Playback Singing on Filmfare Awards South.

Release

Theatrical 
The film had a solo release on 23 July 2010, opening to mixed and negative reviews unlike the original Telugu version.

Home media 
The satellite rights of the film were sold to Sun TV.

Reception 
Whilst a reviewer from Sify.com rated the film as "average" film and added that it is "boring", a reviewer from Behindwoods.com gave 2.5 out of 5, describing the film as an "enjoyable entertainer".  Pavithra Srinivasan from Rediff.com cited the film as a "ridiculous pot-boiler" and criticised Jeyam Ravi's lacking punch and wafer-thin story line, giving the film a mere 1.5 out of 5.  A critic from Times of India also criticised the film saying that it "lacks that light touch needed to carry off the candyfloss content" as well as Jayam Ravi's performance describing his character as "a ham of what is simply a ridiculously featherweight character".  A critic from Chennai Online said "the film somehow manages to entertain with comedy elements".

References

External links 
 

2010 films
Tamil remakes of Telugu films
Indian action comedy films
2010 action comedy films
2010s masala films
2010s Tamil-language films
Films scored by Yuvan Shankar Raja
Films directed by Mohan Raja
Films scored by Thaman S
Films shot in Singapore
Films shot in Kuala Lumpur
Films shot in Bangkok
2010 comedy films
Indian films with live action and animation